Isaac Danning (January 20, 1905 – March 30, 1983) was an American Major League Baseball catcher who played for the St. Louis Browns in . He was Jewish. He attended Polytechnic High School in Los Angeles, California.

After his retirement from baseball he became the head of transportation for 20th Century Fox Studios. He died from lung cancer at the age of 78 and was buried at Hillside Memorial Park in Culver City, California.

References

External links
 Baseball Reference.com

1905 births
1983 deaths
20th Century Studios people
Baseball players from California
Burials at Hillside Memorial Park Cemetery
Deaths from lung cancer in California
Jewish American baseball players
Jewish Major League Baseball players
Major League Baseball catchers
St. Louis Browns players
John H. Francis Polytechnic High School alumni
Idaho Falls Spuds players